This is a list of military aircraft currently in service with the Armed Forces of the United Kingdom.

Royal Air Force

|-
! colspan="8" | Combat Aircraft
|-
| Eurofighter Typhoon || United Kingdom || Jet || Multi-role || 2007 || 102 || ||  16 Tranche 1s have been progressively withdrawn and scrapped under the  requirement which started in late 2016  All Tranche 1s to be retired by 2025.
|-
| Lockheed Martin F-35B Lightning || United States  || Jet || Multi-role || 2013 || 29 || 30 ||  Jointly operated with Fleet Air Arm. Maximum of 60-80 aircraft to be  procured
|-
! colspan="8" |  AEW&C
|-
| Boeing 737 E-7 Wedgetail || United States || Jet || AW&C || 2022 || 0 || 3 || Originally five on order, now reduced to three, to begin operating in 2024.
|-
! colspan="8" |  Reconnaissance
|-
| Beechcraft Shadow R1 || United States || Propeller || ISTAR || 2009 || 6 || 6 ||  Expected  2030. A further two aircraft are to be added in 2023 alongwith an upgrade to the current aircraft
|-
| Boeing Airseeker R1 || United States || Jet || SIGINT || 2013 || 3 || 3 || 
|-
| Boeing Poseidon MRA1 || United States || Jet || ASW/Anti-ship || 2019 || 9 || 9 || 
|-
! colspan="8" | Tanker
|-
| Airbus Voyager || Spain || Jet || Tanker / Transport || 2011 || 12 || 12 ||  Two additional aircraft available upon request from AirTanker Services
|-
! colspan="8" | Transport
|-
| Boeing C-17A Globemaster III || United States || Jet || Transport || 2001 || 8 || 8 || 
|-
| Airbus A400M Atlas C1 || Spain || Propeller || Transport || 2014 || 21 || 34 ||  13 on order expected to be delivered by May 2025
|-
| Dassault Envoy IV CC1 || France || Jet || Transport || 2022 || 2 || 2 || Two aircraft to be introduced from March 2022. To be initially operated under civil contract until 2024
|-
| Lockheed Martin C-130J Super Hercules || United States || Propeller || Transport || 2000 || 13 || 13 ||  All to be withdrawn by 2023.
|-
! colspan="8" | Helicopter
|-
| Leonardo AW109SP || United Kingdom / Italy || Rotorcraft || Transport || 2016 || 1 || 1 ||  Used for transportation of senior military commanders or government ministers
|-
| Bell Griffin HAR2 || Canada || Rotorcraft || Utility helicopter|Utility || 2003 || 3 || 3 ||  Supplied and maintained by Cobham but operated by military aircrew. Used forSAR, fire fighting and ISTAR duties amongst others in RAF Akrotiri, Cyprus
|-
| Boeing Chinook || United States || Rotorcraft || Transport || 1980 || 41 || 59 ||
|-
| Westland Puma HC2 || United Kingdom || Rotorcraft || Transport || 1971 || 14 || 17 || 
|-
! colspan="8" | Trainer Aircraft
|-
| Airbus H135 Juno || Germany || Rotorcraft || Trainer || 2018 || 29 || 29 || 
|-
| Airbus H145 Jupiter || Germany || Rotorcraft || Trainer || 2018 || 7 || 7 ||  
|-
| British Aerospace Hawk T1 || United Kingdom || Jet || Trainer || 1976 || 56 || 172 ||  Retired from aggressor role in March 2022; retained by the Red Arrows; to be retired by 2030. 
|-
| British Aerospace Hawk T2 || United Kingdom || Jet || Trainer || 2009 || 28 || 28||  Forms part of the UK Military Flying Training System listed below but operated by  No. IV (R) Squadron & No. XXV(F) Squadron; aircraft to remain in service until 2040
|-
| Beechcraft Texan T1 || United States || Propeller || Trainer || 2018 || 14 || 14 || 
|-
| Embraer Phenom 100 || Brazil || Jet || Trainer || 2018 || 5 || 5 || 
|-
| Grob Prefect T1 || Germany || Propeller || Trainer || 2018 || 23 || 23 || 
|-
| Grob Tutor T1 || Germany || Propeller || Trainer || 1999 || 91 || 119 ||  Used by the RAF Air Experience Flight. 28 Tutors have been sold to the  Finnish Air Force as of 2018 
|-
| Grob Viking TX1 || Germany || Glider || Trainer || 1990 || 52 || 60 || 
|-
! colspan="8" | UAV
|-
| General Atomics MQ-9 Reaper || United States || UAV || ISR / Attack || 2007 || 9 || 10 ||  Expected  2024. To be replaced by Protector UAV
|}

RAF Red Arrows

|-
| British Aerospace Hawk T1 || United Kingdom || Jet || Trainer || 1980 || 7 || 12 ||  Retired from aggressor role in March 2022; retained by the Red Arrows; to be retired by 2030. 
|-
|}

RAF Centre of Aviation Medicine

RAF Battle of Britain Memorial Flight

|-
| Avro Lancaster (PA474) || United Kingdom || Propeller || Bomber || 1942 || 1 || 1 || 1 B.I
|-
| De Havilland Canada Chipmunk || United Kingdom || Propeller || Trainer || 1946 || 2 || 2 || 2 T.10 
|-
| Douglas Dakota || United States || Propeller || Transport || 1942 || 1 || 1 || 1 C.3 
|-
| Hawker Hurricane || United Kingdom || Propeller || Fighter || 1937 || 2 || 2|| 2 Mk IIc 
|-
| Supermarine Spitfire || United Kingdom || Propeller || Fighter || 1938 || 6 || 6 || 1 Mk IIa, 1 Mk Vb, 1 LF.IXe, 1 LF.XVIe, 2 PR.XIX
|}

Army Air Corps

|-
! colspan="8" | Attack helicopters
|-
| AgustaWestland Apache AH1 || United Kingdom  || Rotorcraft || Attack || 2004 || 18 || 20 ||  To be replaced by 50 AH-64E Apache Guardians in 2024
|-
| Boeing AH-64E Apache Guardian || United States || Rotorcraft || Attack || 2020 || 4 || 16||  Total of 50 aircraft are on order to replace the Apache AH1
|-
! colspan="8" | Patrol helicopters
|-
| Airbus H135M || Germany || Rotorcraft || Patrol || 2022 || || 30 on order ||Project Matcha, Gazelle replacement 
|-
| Westland Gazelle || United Kingdom || Rotorcraft || Patrol || 1974 || 14 || 17 ||  Expected  2025.
|-
! colspan="8" | Transport helicopters
|-
| AgustaWestland AW159 Wildcat || United Kingdom || Rotorcraft || Utility || 2014 || 25 || 34 || 
|- 
| Bell 212 || Canada || Rotorcraft || Utility || 1995 || 3 || 3 ||  Used by No. 25 Flight AAC in Kenya insupport of 
|-
| Eurocopter AS365 Dauphin II || France || Rotorcraft || SAS || 2009 || 6 || 6 ||
|-
! colspan="8" | UAV
|-
| Thales Watchkeeper WK450 || United Kingdom || UAV || ISR || 2014 || 49 || 50 || 
|}

Fleet Air Arm

|-
! colspan="8" | Combat Aircraft
|- 
| Lockheed Martin F-35B Lightning || United States || Jet || Multi-role || 2013 || - || - || Jointly operated with Royal Air Force. Initial Operational Capability (Maritime) in 2020; 809 Naval Air Squadron to stand up in 2023, operational capability projected for 2025
|-
! colspan="8" | Attack helicopters
|-
| AgustaWestland AW159 Wildcat HMA2 || United Kingdom || Rotorcraft || Attack || 2014 || 28 || 28 || 
|-
| AgustaWestland AW101 Merlin HM2 || United Kingdom || Rotorcraft ||ASW/AEW || 2000 || 30 || 44 ||  Expected  2040
|-
! colspan="8" | Transport helicopters
|-
| AgustaWestland AW101 Merlin Mk4/4A || United Kingdom || Rotorcraft || Transport || 2000 || 25 || 28 ||  Expected  2040
|- 
! colspan="8" | Trainer Aircraft
|-
| Beechcraft Avenger || United States || Propeller || Trainer || 2011 || 4 || 4 ||  Forms part of the UK Military Flying Training System listed below but operated by 750 Naval Air Squadron
|-
|}

Ministry of Defence
As well as the military services, a number of defence contractors operate military aircraft on behalf of or leased from the Ministry of Defence.

|-
| Agusta AW109 || Italy || Rotorcraft || Utility ||  || 1 || 1 || QinetiQ, Boscombe Down
|- 
| Eurocopter AS365 Dauphin II || France || Rotorcraft || Utility || 1999 || 2 || 2 ||  Used as transport of  instructors as part of FOST training. Operated by British International Helicopters under MRCOA 
|-
| Eurocopter AS350 Écureuil || France || Rotorcraft || Trainer || || 3 || 3 || Cobham Helicopter Academy, Newquay under CFAOS
|-
| Eurofighter Typhoon || United Kingdom || Jet || Multi-role ||  || 3 || 3 || BAE Systems, Warton
|- 
| Hawker Hunter || UK || Jet || Fighter ||  || 3 || 3 || Hawker Hunter Aviation, RAF Scampton
|- 
| Lockheed Martin F-35B Lightning II || United States || Jet || Multi-role || 2013 || - || - || Three of 29 F-35Bs operated in the United States by 17 Squadron RAF; test and evaluation role
|-
| Westland Sea King || United Kingdom || Rotorcraft || Trainer ||  || 2 || 2 || HeliOperations under CFAOS
|-
| Airbus Zephyr || United Kingdom || High-altitude pseudo-satellite || UAV ||  || 3 || 3 || Solar-powered long-endurance UAV; observation and communications platform
|}

UK Military Flying Training System

|-
| Grob Prefect T1 || Germany || Propeller || Trainer || 2018 || 23 || 23 || 
|-
| Beechcraft Texan T1 || United States || Propeller || Trainer || 2018 || 14 || 14 || 
|-
| Embraer Phenom 100 || Brazil || Jet || Trainer || 2018 || 5 || 5 || 
|-
| Airbus H135 Juno || Germany || Rotorcraft || Trainer || 2018 || 29 || 29 || 
|-
| Airbus H145 Jupiter || Germany || Rotorcraft || Trainer || 2018 || 7 || 7 ||  
|}

See also

British Armed Forces
List of aircraft of the Royal Air Force
Future of the Royal Air Force

Notes

References

External links
United Kingdom Defence Statistics - 2014 (gov.uk)
United Kingdom Defence Statistics - 2013 (dasa.mod.uk)

Military aircraft
United Kingdom Active Military Aircraft List
United Kingdom military-related lists